The Apostolic Vicariate of El Beni (or Beni for short) is a Latin Church missionary ecclesiastical territory or apostolic vicariate. As an exempt territory, it is not part of any ecclesiastical province. Its cathedra is in the Catedral de la Santísima Trinidad (devoted to the Holy Trinity), in the episcopal see of Trinidad in Bolivia's Amazonian interior.

History 
On 1 December 1917 Pope Benedict XV established as Apostolic Vicariate of El Beni on territory split off from the then Diocese of Santa Cruz de la Sierra (now an archdiocese).

It lost territory twice in 1942, when Pope Pius XII created the Apostolic Vicariate of Pando and Apostolic Vicariate of Reyes.

Exceptionally for a pre-diocesan jurisdiction, it was repeatedly (since 1781) given an auxiliary bishop, so as to be headed by two titular bishops.

Ordinaries 
''So far, all members of the missionary Friars Minor (O.F.M.)
 Ramón Calvó y Martí, O.F.M., Titular Bishop of Catenna (13 August 1919 – † 5 March 1926)
 Pedro Francisco Luna Pachón, O.F.M., Titular Bishop of Titiopolis (10 July 1926 – 1953) Resigned
 Carlos Anasagasti Zulueta, O.F.M., Titular Bishop of Caltadria (29 June 1953 – 17 November 1986) Resigned
 Auxiliary Bishop Manuel Eguiguren Galarraga, O.F.M., Titular Bishop of Salpi (1981.11.30 – 2007.06.06)
 Julio María Elías Montoya, O.F.M., Titular Bishop of Cuma (17 November 1986 – 22 February 2020) Retired
 Auxiliary Bishop Francisco Focardi Mazzocchi, O.F.M., Titular Bishop of Cenculiana (2007.06.06 – 2009.07.15)
 Auxiliary Bishop Roberto Bordi, O.F.M., Titular Bishop of Mutugenna (2010.11.06 – ...)
 Aurelio Pesoa Ribera, O.F.M. (2020.11.28 -

See also 
 List of Jesuit sites
 Roman Catholicism in Bolivia

References

Sources and external links
 GigaCatholic, with incumbent biography links

Apostolic vicariates
Roman Catholic dioceses in Bolivia
Christian organizations established in 1917
Roman Catholic ecclesiastical provinces in Bolivia
Trinidad, Bolivia